Hamiltonian may refer to:
 Hamiltonian mechanics, a function that represents the total energy of a system
 Hamiltonian (quantum mechanics), an operator corresponding to the total energy of that system
 Dyall Hamiltonian, a modified Hamiltonian with two-electron nature
 Molecular Hamiltonian, the Hamiltonian operator representing the energy of the electrons and nuclei in a molecule
 Hamiltonian (control theory), a function used to solve a problem of optimal control for a dynamical system
 Hamiltonian path, a path in a graph that visits each vertex exactly once
 Hamiltonian group, a non-abelian group the subgroups of which are all normal
 Hamiltonian economic program, the economic policies advocated by Alexander Hamilton, the first United States Secretary of the Treasury

See also
 Alexander Hamilton (1755 or 1757–1804), American statesman and one of the Founding Fathers of the US
 Hamilton (disambiguation)
 List of things named after William Rowan Hamilton